Thandolwethu Emily Nomvula Sikwila, known mononymously as Thando, is a Zimbabwean Australian singer, songwriter and actor based in Melbourne, Victoria. She's most notable for her appearances on The Voice Australia. She was a contestant on season three, but was eliminated in the sing-offs. She later returned in season eleven and made it to the finals. She also portrayed Effie White in Australia's first professional production of Dreamgirls, presented by StageArt.

Early life 
Thando was born in Bulawayo, Zimbabwe on 9 April 1993 to parents Nokuthula and Victor Sikwila. Thando is bilingual being able to speak Ndebele.

Career

The Voice Australia 2014
She auditioned for the third season of The Voice Australia with the song Mercy at the age of twenty and chose Kylie Minogue as her coach. She was eliminated in the sing-offs.

The Voice Australia 2022
She auditioned for The Voice Australia again in 2022, for its eleventh season. She turned all four chairs in her blind audition due to her amazing, powerful and soulful voice, and chose Keith Urban as her coach. She made it to the Grand Finale and ended up placing second, with Lachie Gill taking the $100 000 prize.

Discography

Extended plays

Singles

Guest or featured artist 
 "Brainless" - Sinks feat. Thando (single, 2017, independent)
 "The Antidote" - Sinks feat. Dyl Thomas, Mol One, Thando (single, 2017, independent)
 "My People" - Remi feat. Thando (single, 2018, House of Beige)
 "All That I Got" - Royalty Noise feat. Thando (single, 2018, independent)

References 

1993 births
Musicians from Melbourne
Living people
Australian women singers
Australian people of Zimbabwean descent
21st-century Australian women singers
21st-century Australian singers